Walmington-on-Sea is a fictional seaside resort that is the setting of Dad's Army, including the BBC Television sitcom (1968-1977), the BBC Radio 4 series and two feature films (1971 and 2016).

Walmington-on-Sea is on the south coast of England which, following the fall of France and the evacuation of the British Expeditionary Force from Dunkirk during the Second World War, found itself on the front line against Hitler. It is situated in Sussex  and the nearest large town is Eastbourne, where Captain Mainwaring was educated in the local grammar school.

The series followed the adventures and misadventures of members of a fictional platoon of the Home Guard: Captain George Mainwaring (Arthur Lowe), Sergeant Arthur Wilson (John Le Mesurier), Lance Corporal Jack Jones (Clive Dunn), Private James Frazer (John Laurie), Private Charles Godfrey (Arnold Ridley), Private Frank Pike (Ian Lavender) and Private Joe Walker (James Beck who died suddenly during production of Series 6 in 1973). The Home Guard was a volunteer army formed from those ineligible for conscription by age, minor physical inability or occupation, to defend the United Kingdom from German invasion following the fall of France.

Amenities and filming locations

 

Over the nine television series, the action is set in various places in Walmington-on-Sea, the interiors of which were built in the television studios, while the exterior scenes were filmed at various Norfolk locations. Those included a pleasure pier (filmed in Great Yarmouth) with a 20-foot (6m) wide gap blown in the middle to prevent it from being used as a landing stage by invading armed forces. The beach is protected with barbed wire and other defences including mines, pillboxes and tank traps.

Other locations, typical of a seaside town during the Second World War, included a sweet shop, The Novelty Rock Emporium, at least two banks (the fictional Swallows Bank, which appeared in early episodes, and the real Martins Bank), the Marigold tea room, Anne's Pantry, the Dutch Oven, Corporal Jones's butcher's shop, Hodges' greengrocers, Frazer's undertakers, a cinema and numerous pubs including the Red Lion, which all suggest it was a reasonably sized place. There is also a Free Polish Club for Polish servicemen. In common with most real British towns, Walmington-on-Sea has a church, Saint Aldhelm's, with a hall next door which is the setting for various community events in the episodes such as the Christmas pantomime and a place for the Sea Scouts to parade. It is also where the Walmington-on-Sea Home Guard platoon muster on parade nights.

Many outdoor scenes were filmed at Thetford, an inland town in Norfolk. The 1971 film, Dad's Army, moved location to Chalfont St Giles, even further from the coast. The 2016 film, Dad's Army, was filmed even more distantly, in Yorkshire.

Thetford's Guildhall (today the home of the Dad's Army Museum) became Walmington-on-Sea's Town Hall. The Guildhall featured in the 1972 episode Time on My Hands, in which a German Luftwaffe pilot dangled from the clock tower when his parachute became caught in the clock's hands. The Guildhall was also used in the 1974 episode "The Captain's Car". The distinctive flint cottages in Thetford's Nether Row appeared in four episodes: "Man Hunt", "The Armoured Might of Lance Corporal Jones", "The Big Parade" and "Time on My Hands". Mill Lane was used in "The Deadly Attachment", while Thetford's real-life Palace Cinema (now a bingo hall) doubled as Walmington-on-Sea's Empire Cinema in two episodes – "The Big Parade" (1970) and "A Soldier's Farewell" (1972).

Brandon railway station was used for exterior shots of Walmington-on-Sea railway station, while the platforms of Weybourne Station on the preserved North Norfolk Railway (a heritage steam railway) stood in for the platforms at Walmington-on-Sea station in the episode "The Royal Train".

Residents

Pubs
The Red Lion
The Six Bells
The Anchor
The Black Lion
The Dog & Partridge
The King's Head
The Feathers
The Fox
The Hare & Hounds
The Horse & Groom
The Horse & Hounds
The Fox & Pheasant
The Goat & Compasses
The Marquis of Granby

Tea shops
The Marigold Tea Rooms
Anne's Pantry
The Dutch Oven

References

External links
Description of Walmington-on-Sea
Location of Walmington-on-Sea

Dad's Army
Fictional populated places in England